Koca Katran Lübnan sediri (literally: Big old cedar of Lebanon) is a monumental old cedar of Lebanon (Cedrus libani) in Antalya Province, southern Turkey. It is a registered natural monument of the country.

Koca Katran is located within Çığlıkara Nature Reserve, a cedar forest, in Elmalı district of Antalya Province.

The old tree was registered a natural monument in 1995. The age of the cedar was dated as 2000 years old when it was registered.

See also
 List of individual trees
 List of oldest trees

References 

Individual conifers
Individual trees in Turkey
Natural monuments of Turkey
Antalya Province
Elmalı District
Oldest trees